, also known as RNB, is a Japanese broadcast network affiliated with Nippon News Network (NNN). Their headquarters are located in Matsuyama, Ehime Prefecture.

Network 
 TV: Nippon News Network (NNN)
 RADIO: Japan Radio Network (JRN), National Radio Network (NRN)

History 

 August 1, 1953: Nankai Broadcasting's radio license is applied.
 September 28, 1953: Nankai Broadcasting is established.
 October 1, 1953: Nankai Broadcasting commences broadcasting.
 December 1, 1958: Television broadcasts commence.
 October 1, 1964: Color broadcasts commence.
 December 10, 1969: All Fuji TV shows move to the newly launched FNN station EBC.
 May 13, 1970: Nankai Broadcasting exchanges footage of the Setouchi Sea Jack incident with Hiroshima Telecasting.
 March 15, 1980: AM stereo broadcasts are conducted.
 February 21, 1988: RNB transmits the Ehime Marathon for the first time.
 July 19, 1990: RNB starts dual audio broadcasting for certain shows.
 March 2000: Club N, a mobile site, opens.
 June 21, 2006: Digital terrestrial broadcasts commence.
 July 24, 2011: Analog terrestrial broadcasts conclude.
 April 2012: RNB opens their official Facebook page.
 December 1, 2014: A new FM station, Fnam, launches.

Stations

Analog TV
Matsuyama (Main Station) JOAF-TV 10ch 5 kW
Imabari 34ch 100w
Yawatahama 4ch 250w
Niihama JOAL-TV 6ch 250w

Digital TV(ID:4) 
Matsuyama (Main Station) JOAF-DTV 20ch
Niihama 47ch

AM Radio (1116kHz) 
Matsuyama (Main Station) 5 kW JOAF
Niihama 1 kW JOAL
Uwajima 1 kW JOAM
Ōzu 100w JOAN
Misho 100w JOAS
Yawatahama 100w

FM Radio (91.7 MHz FM) 
Matsuyama (Main Station) 1 kW

External links
 RNB Official Site

Companies based in Ehime Prefecture
Television stations in Japan
Radio in Japan
Nippon News Network
Television channels and stations established in 1958
Mass media in Matsuyama, Ehime
1958 establishments in Japan